Jean Charles, Chevalier de Folard, commonly referred to as the Chevalier de Folard, 13 February 1669 – 23 March 1752, was a French soldier and military theorist who championed the use of infantry columns rather than the prevailing trend towards linear formations. Although his tactics were generally dismissed in his lifetime and he died in obscurity, his ideas remained influential in the long-running debate on military theory that followed.

Personal details
Jean Charles de Folard was born on 13 February 1669 to Jérôme de Folard (1631–1706), a Professor of Law, and Madeleine de Ruffi (died 1688). Originally from England, the Folard family settled in Savoy during the 13th century, before moving to Avignon at the end of the 16th.

One of seven surviving children, Foulard was the second of four brothers. The eldest, Nicolas-Joseph (1664–1734), was a canon at Nîmes Cathedral and a noted scholar, while the youngest, Melchior (1684–1739), also became a priest and wrote a number of plays which are now largely forgotten. Little is known of the last brother, Paul (1683–after 1745), who had a long and undistinguished military career, retiring in 1745 after forty years of service as a captain.

Career

Early career 
Like his brothers, Folard was educated by the Jesuits but ran away to join the French Royal Army at the age of 16, an action allegedly inspired by reading Caesar's "Commentaries". Forced to return home after his father wrote to his commanding officer, in 1687 he was allowed to join the Régiment de Béarn as an Officer cadet. Promoted Second lieutenant on the outbreak of the Nine Years War in 1688, his unit spent most of the war on garrison duty and when peace came in 1697, Folard was an obscure lieutenant.

War of the Spanish Succession 

The War of the Spanish Succession began in July 1701 and in early 1702 Folard's regiment was sent to secure Naples, where he spent most of the next three years. He used the time to produce a series of tactical ideas and suggestions which brought him to the attention of the duc de Vendôme, commander of the French forces in Italy. Despite this, promotion remained slow, partially because frustrated by inactivity and feeling his talents were unrecognised, Folard was unpopular with his superior officers. In October 1703, Savoy joined the anti-French Grand Alliance and during the 1704 campaign in Lombardy, Folard served under Vendôme's less talented brother, Philippe de Vendôme, also known as the "Grand Prior".

The Lombardy campaign primarily consisted of siege and positional warfare, which allowed Folard to display his engineering skills and by the end of 1704 he was acting as technical advisor to the Grand Prior. Badly wounded in the stomach at the Battle of Cassano in August 1705, he was awarded the Cross of St. Louis in recognition of his service. While recuperating, Folard began to develop his ideas on the use of columns which formed the basis of his intellectual effort from then on.

He recovered in time for the 1706 campaign and was appointed deputy to the commander of the French garrison in Modena. Defeat at Ramillies in July forced Louis XIV of France to withdraw many of his forces from Italy, while the breaking of the Siege of Turin left Modena isolated and it surrendered in February 1707 after a siege of four months. In March 1707, the Convention of Milan provided the remaining French troops in Italy free passage to France, rather than being held as prisoners of war.

They included Folard, who was transferred to Flanders and served under Vendôme during the 1708 campaign, although he did not participate in any major action. Badly wounded once again at Malplaquet in 1709 and with the war largely at a stalemate from 1710, Folard continued to bombard his superiors with ideas and suggestions. In 1711, he was made military Governor of Bourbourg; following the Peace of Utrecht in 1713, he lost this position although he was allowed to retain half his salary.

Later career

In 1714, he joined a group of French officers and engineers sent to support the Knights Hospitallers, who feared their base in Malta was threatened by the Ottoman–Venetian War. Instead, the Ottomans attacked Venetian possessions in Greece and after falling out with his colleagues, Folard returned to France in 1715.

Sponsored by Georg Heinrich von Görtz, in 1716 he entered the service of Charles XII of Sweden, then engaged in the latter stages of the Great Northern War, and whom Folard considered the most talented general of his time. While in Stockholm, he set out his tactical ideas in the form of a commentary on the works of the Greek historian Polybius; he left Sweden on the grounds of ill-health in November 1717 and was shipwrecked on the voyage home, losing all his papers and baggage. During the War of the Quadruple Alliance, Folard served under the Duke of Berwick at the Siege of San Sebastián in 1719 and was finally promoted to Colonel. However, his habit of arguing with his superiors resurfaced and he wrote to the Minister of War criticising Berwick's tactics, which he regarded as excessively cautious. With Europe finally at peace, this was the end of his active military career.

Retirement 
Folard spent the next decade preparing his commentaries on Polybius, which were published in 1724 and 1729 respectively. By analysing the battles described by Polybius and adding his own insights, he sought to identify a consistent set of military principles, which included both tactics and leadership. Although some were supported by an influential minority, his contemporaries were largely unconvinced and Folard spent much of his time refuting their criticisms. After Folard's death in 1753, Frederick the Great produced a handbook or "Extract" based on his work; this excluded his ideas on columns and primarily contains Folard's account of Cassano and his claim that it proved the offensive power of the bayonet; it was this aspect that made it attractive to Frederick, who wanted to install aggressiveness into his officer corps.

During the early 1730s, Folard became involved with the Catholic theological movement known as Jansenism, in particular the faction known as Convulsionnaires. Declared heretical by the Catholic church and viewed with suspicion by the French state, his biographer suggests Folard's involvement was driven not by depth of religious feeling but antipathy towards Cardinal de Fleury, the government chief minister who was a leading opponent of Jansenism and had rejected his pleas for an increased pension. Folard was elected a Fellow of the Royal Society of London in 1750  and died on 23 March 1752 in Avignon, where a number of public buildings and streets are named after him, including the Piscine Chevalier de Folard.

Military theories

Before the War of the Spanish Succession, the French army was viewed as the pre-eminent force in Europe but by 1714 this was no longer the case and Folard's work formed part of an extensive discussion on tactics and leadership that resulted. Although most famous for his advocacy of infantry columns rather than linear formations, his writings contain a large number of precepts. Some, such as his principles of leadership, were considered to have great merit, others less so, notably his support for the restoration of pikes, an infantry weapon considered obsolete by the mid-17th century. Maurice de Saxe, often quoted as a supporter, respected his opinions but strongly criticised many of his conclusions, while Frederick the Great described his work as "diamonds buried in a dung heap".

Folard's system contained two essential elements, one being a preference for columns or Ordre profond rather than line formations, which he argued were too thin and unwieldy to be effective in offence and lacked solidity in defence. Based on an analysis of Greek battles as described by Polybius and the use of the Phalanx by generals like Epaminondas, he claimed a deep mass of troops allowed sufficient shock to attack and break enemy lines while also providing defensive stability. Second was the mixed Order of battle, with his columns consisting of infantry intermixed with cavalry and light guns for mutual support.

Both critics and those who felt he made some good points generally agreed on the weaknesses of this system. Although easier and faster to manoeuvre than line formations, once in motion columns proved almost impossible to control, particularly if repulsed, a criticism Folard sidestepped by claiming their attacks never failed. His columns were also vulnerable to being outflanked and had low rates of fire; the latter exposed one of Folard's most significant errors, his contention that modern firearms were not powerful enough to win battles on their own. While there was some merit to this argument in 1700, developments in artillery and infantry weapons meant by the 1730s this was no longer the case. Finally, his mixed order of battle meant the cavalry effectively had to move at the same pace as the infantry, neutralising their offensive ability.

Nevertheless, although his specific system was generally dismissed, his ideas and concepts retained considerable influence and gained renewed attention in the debate over tactics that followed French defeat in the 1756 to 1763 Seven Years' War, with François-Jean de Mesnil-Durand (1736–1799) being a leading advocate of his theories. His belief that the bayonet charge was particularly suited to the French "offensive spirit" resurfaced immediately before World War I in the tactics advocated by Louis Loyzeau de Grandmaison. Widely accepted, these formed the basis of Plan XVII, the French masterplan for the beginning of the war which led to enormous casualties when faced with the reality of machine guns and modern artillery.

Publications
Folard wrote the following.
 Nouvelles découvertes sur la guerre dans une dissertation sur Polybe (1724);
 Histoire de Polybe, nouvellement traduite du grec par Dom Vincent Thuillier, avec un commentaire ou un corps de science militaire enrichi de notes critiques et historiques par F. de Folard (1729);
 Histoire de Scipion l'Africain, pour servir de suite aux hommes illustres de Plutarque. Avec les observations de M. le chevalier de Folard sur la bataille de Zama (1738);
 Histoire d'Épaminondas pour servir de suite aux hommes illustres de Plutarque, avec des remarques de M. le Chevalier de Folard sur les principales batailles d'Épaminondas, par M. l'abbé Séran de La Tour (1739);

Notes

References

Sources
 
  
 
 
 
 
  
 * 
 

1669 births
1752 deaths
French military writers
French military personnel of the War of the Spanish Succession
French military personnel of the War of the Quadruple Alliance
Knights of the Order of Saint Louis
Military theorists
Fellows of the Royal Society
Military personnel from Avignon